Här kommer bärsärkarna is a 1965 Swedish adventure film directed by Arne Mattsson and starring Carl-Gustaf Lindstedt.

Cast
 Carl-Gustaf Lindstedt as Glum
 Dirch Passer as Garm
 Åke Söderblom as Hjorvard
 Nils Hallberg as Cassius
 Loredana Nusciak as Veronica
 Walter Chiari as Pollo
 Karl-Arne Holmsten as Olav
 Elisabeth Odén as Vigdis
 Carl-Axel Elfving as Mullgott
 Curt Ericson as Tjarve
 Hans Wallbom as Kutt
 Olof Huddén as Kaptenen
 Daniela Igliozzi as Fatima
 Valeria Fabrizi as Elina

References

External links

1965 films
Swedish adventure comedy films
1960s Swedish-language films
Films directed by Arne Mattsson
Films set in the Roman Empire
Films set in the Byzantine Empire
Films set in the Viking Age
1960s parody films
1960s adventure comedy films
1960s historical comedy films
Films scored by Carlo Savina
1965 comedy films
1960s Swedish films